"Chasing the Sun" is a song by English-Irish boy band the Wanted. It was released as their third single in the United States on 17 April 2012, from their eponymous debut EP (2012). It is also the lead single from their third studio album, Word of Mouth (2013).

The song was co-written by Alex Smith and English rapper Example, and is one of the two theme songs for the 2012 animated film Ice Age: Continental Drift. "Chasing the Sun" was released in the United Kingdom on 20 May 2012 and debuted at number two on the UK Singles Chart, it also reached number 18 on the Canadian Hot 100 as well as number 50 on the U.S. Billboard Hot 100 whilst also reaching the top 20 in several other countries.

Background
In a December 2011 interview with Digital Spy, band member Jay McGuiness was asked about a track written for the group by singer and rapper Example. "Yeah, we've been talking with him for ages," McGuiness said. "He sent a few before that didn't quite make it, but we've got one from him now that we absolutely love. Tom has it on his iPod and it's now become his most played song on there! We're hopefully going to record the track this week. It's actually similar in some ways to 'Glad You Came'. It won't be out before Christmas because people don't want to be raving when it's p*ssing with snow." On 26 March 2012, the Wanted premiered said track, entitled "Chasing the Sun".

Talking to MTV News, McGuiness said: "I think this song, it can mean many things. To some people, it is partying all night and chasing the sun the next morning. That's what [the first] video's about, the girls, the teeth are there, the vampires. So we're all there partying away. And that's one aspect of the song. Another aspect of the song is chasing your dreams, the unattainable acorn in the distance."

Music video
There are two music videos for "Chasing the Sun". The first and official video was directed by Director X. It begins with the Wanted standing on the roof of the Rosslyn Hotel in Los Angeles in the middle of the night. It then begins to intersect with scenes of them in a club with some mysterious women, all of whom have strange sun-shaped tattoos on their hands, arms, thighs or belly. Each of the band meets one of these women and, upon being touched by them, all suddenly have exactly the same tattoo. The band decide to leave the club with their women and start walking down the secluded streets. They soon enter a different club. At the bridge, the boys are back on the roof of the Rosslyn Hotel, but this time at sunrise. The scene then changes back to the second club, where the boys start to get close to their women, but it turns out that the women are actually vampires, and all five boys get their necks bitten. The video ends with the Wanted walking out of the club into the bright sunlight. The video has over 120 million views on YouTube.

The second video was specifically made for the 2012 film Ice Age: Continental Drift. It features the Wanted performing on blocks of ice in the Arctic Ocean while characters such as Manny, Sid, and Diego dance alongside them. It also contains footage from the film.

Critical reception
The song received positive reviews from music critics. Robert Copsey of Digital Spy gave the song four out of five stars writing, "The result may be their darkest club track yet, but it's easily the brightest they've shined since that worldwide smash."

Track listing
UK CD single / digital EP
 "Chasing the Sun" – 3:14
 "Chasing the Sun" (Tantrum Desire Dubstep Remix) – 5:22
 "Fix You" (Live) – 3:29
 "Glad You Came" (Live) – 3:22

German CD single
 "Chasing the Sun" (2012 Remaster) – 3:14
 "Fix You" (Live) – 3:29

Hardwell Remix
 "Chasing the Sun" (Hardwell Extended Mix) – 5:50

The Remixes
 "Chasing the Sun" (Hardwell Edit) - 3:15
 "Chasing the Sun" (Hardwell Extended) - 5:15
 "Chasing the Sun" (Hardwell Instrumental) - 5:15
 "Chasing the Sun" (Danny Verde Edit) - 3:32
 "Chasing the Sun" (Danny Verde Club) - 7:21
 "Chasing the Sun" (Danny Verde Dub) - 7:38
 "Chasing the Sun" (Joe Maz Edit) - 3:43
 "Chasing the Sun" (Joe Maz Extended) - 5:15
 "Chasing the Sun" (HJoe Maz Instrumental) - 5:15
 "Chasing the Sun" (Smash Mode Radio) - 3:33
 "Chasing the Sun" (Smash Mode Extended) - 4:56
 "Chasing the Sun" (Tantrum Desire Hard Mix) - 5:12
 "Chasing the Sun" (Tantrum Desire Light Mix) - 5:21

Remixes
 "Chasing the Sun" (Mario Larrea Remix Edit) - 3:30
 "Chasing the Sun" (Mario Larrea Club Remix) - 5:41
 "Chasing the Sun" (Mario Larrea Dub Remix) - 5:40
 "Chasing the Sun" (Tantrum Desire Remix) - 5:22
 "Chasing the Sun" (Tantrum Desire Hard Mix) - 5:13
 "Chasing the Sun" (Paris Opera House Remix) - 5:39

Credits and personnel
Recording
Recorded at Metrophonic Studios, London, England
Mixed at Mixsuite, Los Angeles, United States

Personnel
 Alex Smith – songwriter, producer, recording, keyboards, programming
 Elliot Gleave – songwriter
 Mark "Spike" Stent – mixer
 Matty Green – assistant mixer
 Tom Coyne – mastering

Charts and certifications

Weekly charts

Year-end charts

Certifications

Radio and release history

See also
 List of Billboard Dance Club Songs number ones of 2012

References

2012 singles
The Wanted songs
Dance-pop songs
Eurodance songs
Island Records singles
Mercury Records singles
Number-one singles in Scotland
Music videos directed by Director X
Songs written by Example (musician)
2011 songs
2012 songs
Electropop songs